Hofgeest is a town in the Dutch province of North Holland. It is a part of the municipality of Velsen, and lies about 7 km north of Haarlem.

The statistical area "Hofgeest", which also can include the surrounding countryside, has a population of around 110.

References
 

Populated places in North Holland